The Hamilton Spectator Trophy is awarded annually by the Ontario Hockey League to the team that finishes the regular season with the best record. The trophy was donated by The Hamilton Spectator, and first presented in the 1957–58 season. It is symbolic of first place overall, and home-ice advantage throughout the playoffs.

Winners
List of winners of the Hamilton Spectator Trophy.

First place overall, 1938–1958
List of teams finishing first place in the OHA Junior A tier from 1933 to 1958. From 1933 to 1938, Junior A team played in separate groups with an uneven number of games, so there is no accurate depiction of first place in the regular season.

See also
 Jean Rougeau Trophy - QMJHL
 Scotty Munro Memorial Trophy - WHL
 List of Canadian Hockey League awards

References

External links
 Ontario Hockey League

Ontario Hockey League trophies and awards
Awards established in 1958
1958 establishments in Ontario